Startup U is an American reality television series that premiered on August 11, 2015 on Freeform (then ABC Family). The show is about students in an entrepreneur mentoring program in Silicon Valley.

Startup U is based on Draper University, a 7-week residential program in entrepreneurship.

Cast

 Tim Draper, founder of Draper University.
 Sequoia Blodgett, Draper University entrepreneur in residence.
 Charlie Taibi, Draper University program director.
 Erin Brady
 Tony Capasso
 John Randolph Parkhill Frye
 Shawn Isaac
 David Kram
 Ana Marte
 Carly Martinetti
 Keyonna Patterson
 Malcolm Jamaal Tyson
 Sharon Winter

Format
Startup U follows 10 entrepreneurial techies looking to make names for themselves. Each founder endures a grueling seven-week program at Draper University, a program led by billionaire founder and venture capitalist Tim Draper. The series is produced by Ugly Brother Studios, a Sky Vision partner.

Episodes

References

External links
 
 Draper University, home of Startup U
 Apply to the "Startup U" program

2010s American reality television series
2015 American television series debuts
2015 American television series endings
ABC Family original programming
English-language television shows
Freeform (TV channel) original programming
Television series by Disney–ABC Domestic Television